The 1952 Estonian SSR Football Championship was won by Baltic Fleet Tallinn.

Group A

Group B

Championship play-off

Bottom play-off

References

Estonian Football Championship
Est
Football